The South American Energy Council is a body set up to co-ordinate the regional energy policy of the Union of South American Nations (UNASUR).

History 
Its establishment was agreed at the first South American Energy Summit, which took place on April 16–17 2007 on Isla Margarita in the  Venezuelan state of Nueva Esparta. It was officially created in May 2010 during the UNASUR's Extraordinary Summit in Los Cardales, Argentina.

In 2012, the Council started to draft a South American Energy Treaty. Before drafting this treaty, the Council coordinated the creation of an energy balance and a 15-point strategy.

See also

South American Organization of Gas Producers and Exporters

References

Union of South American Nations
International energy organizations
Organizations established in 2007
Energy policy
Energy in Argentina
Energy in Bolivia
Energy in Brazil
Energy in Chile
Energy in Colombia
Energy in Ecuador
Energy in Guyana
Energy in Paraguay
Energy in Peru
Energy in Suriname
Energy in Uruguay
Energy in Venezuela
Energy in South America